Avdhoot Dandekar (born 9 July 1990) is an Indian cricketer. He made his List A debut on 7 October 2019, for Maharashtra in the 2019–20 Vijay Hazare Trophy. He made his first-class debut on 9 December 2019, for Maharashtra in the 2019–20 Ranji Trophy.

References

External links
 

1990 births
Living people
Indian cricketers
Maharashtra cricketers
Place of birth missing (living people)